Siragi is a rural locality (a selo) in Gubdensky Selsoviet, Karabudakhkentsky District, Republic of Dagestan, Russia. The population was 602 as of 2010. There are 3 streets.

Geography 
Siragi is located 39 km southeast of Karabudakhkent (the district's administrative centre) by road. Dzhanga and Leninkent are the nearest rural localities.

Nationalities 
Dargins live there.

References 

Rural localities in Karabudakhkentsky District